Francis Villiers may refer to:

 Francis Child Villiers (1819–1862), British politician
 Francis Hyde Villiers (1852–1925), British civil servant and diplomat